Constantius II (Greek: Κωνστάντιος Β΄), (1789–1859) served as Ecumenical Patriarch of Constantinople during the period 1834–1835.

Before his election as Ecumenical Patriarch in 1834, he had been Metropolitan bishop of Veliko Tarnovo. He wasn't particularly educated, nor did he have administrative skills. So, the next year he had to resign. He retired to Arnavutköy on the Bosphorus, where he died in 1859. He was buried in the forecourt of the Holy Church of Asomatoi in Arnavutköy.

Sources 
 Οικουμενικό Πατριαρχείο
 www.megarevma.net

1859 deaths
Metropolitans of Tarnovo
19th-century Ecumenical Patriarchs of Constantinople
1789 births